Shin Hyun-joon (Korean: 신현준; Hanja: 申鉉俊; October 23, 1915 – October 14, 2007) was the first Commandant of the Republic of Korea Marine Corps. He is South Korea's longest-serving general officer, as well as the nation's longest-serving ambassador. Shin is known as "The Father of the Marine Corps."

Career
Shin was born in Japanese-occupied Korea but grew up in Manchuria and served with the Manchukuo Imperial Army during the 1930s. He joined the South Korean coast guard, the predecessor of the Republic of Korea Navy, as a lieutenant in 1946, during the U.S. military transitional period. Following the failed amphibious assault during the Yosu Rebellion, Admiral Son Won-il tasked Shin with creating a ground combat unit (陸戦隊) within the Navy.  he was assigned as one of the core members of ROK Marines and founded ROK Marine Corps on April 15, 1949. Colonel Shin commanded Marines during the Incheon Landing, served as the ROKMC's commandant throughout the Korean War. He voluntarily relinquished the Corps' top position following the war, but remained in uniform until May 1961.

Shin headed the ROK Marine Corps from April 15, 1949 until October 15, 1953, being awarded by the U.S. in 1950 with the Silver Star medal including 5 more prizes and decorations that were awarded to him by the South Korean government. 

President Park Chung-hee appointed Shin to a series of ambassadorship posts. He served as South Korea's first ambassador to the Kingdom of Morocco, with additional accreditation to Liberia. He subsequently served as delegate to the World Anti-Communist League. Ambassador Shin served as the first South Korean ambassador to the Holy See, serving during the reigns of Pope Paul VI, Pope John Paul I, and Pope John Paul II.

Later life and death 
In his later years, he lived in Niceville, Florida. He died on October 14, 2007, in Niceville, Florida and was buried at the Daejeon National Cemetery in South Korea. He had two sons, Ong-Mok Shin and Ong-In Shin, and four daughters Cecila LaForet, Soon Mi Shin, Soon Wa Shin, and Maria Abbott. Shin's wife, Ham Hae-ryong, died six years before him in 2001.

Awards and decorations 
October 1950 - Silver Star Medal (United States)

August 1951- Legion of Merit, Degree of Commander (United States)

October 1951 - Order of Military Merit, Ulchi with Gold Star

October 1952 - Order of Military Merit, Taeguk with Silver Star

December 1952 - Order of Military Merit, Chungmu with Gold Star

June 1953 - Order of Military Merit, Chungmu

October 1953 - Order of Military Merit, Taeguk with Silver Star

February 1954 - Legion of Merit, Degree of Chief Commander (United States)

November 1954 - Order of Military Merit, Ulchi with Gold Star

December 1962 - Order of Military Merit, Chungmu with Silver Star

December 1963 - Diplomatic Service Award

January 1964 - Great Band (President Tubman of Liberia)

July 1970 - Grand Cordon (King Hassan of Morocco)

June 1976 - Grand Cross of the Order of Pope Pius IX (Pope Paul VI)

References

1915 births
2007 deaths
South Korean generals
Republic of Korea Marine Corps personnel
South Korean military personnel of the Korean War
Recipients of the Silver Star
Ambassadors of South Korea to the Holy See
South Korean expatriates in the United States
People from Niceville, Florida
Sin clan of Pyongsan